BGF may refer to:

 the IATA airport code for Bangui M'Poko International Airport in the Central African Republic
 Black Guerrilla Family
 Business Growth Fund, an investment company providing patient capital for small and medium-sized enterprises in the UK and Ireland
 Bob's Game Forum
 the Border Guard Forces, subdivisions of the Burmese armed forces, consisting of former insurgent groups in Myanmar (Burma)